David Martín García (born 27 August 1992) is a Spanish footballer who plays as a winger or forward for Algeciras CF.

Club career
Born in Segovia, Castile and León, Martín began his career with hometown's CD Quintanar Segovia, but later moved to CD Numancia in 2010, making his senior debuts with the reserves in the 2011–12 season. On 17 March 2013 he appeared in his first official game with the first team, a 3–1 home win against Elche CF in the Segunda División championship.

On 22 July 2014 Martín was loaned to Segunda División B's CD Tudelano. Roughly a year later he rescinded with the Rojillos, and signed a one-year deal with Barakaldo CF in the third tier.

Martín subsequently played for third division sides Burgos CF, CD Badajoz, CF Rayo Majadahonda, FC Andorra and Algeciras CF, achieving promotion to the second division with Andorra in 2022.

References

External links

1992 births
Living people
People from Segovia
Sportspeople from the Province of Segovia
Spanish footballers
Footballers from Castile and León
Association football forwards
Segunda División players
Primera Federación players
Segunda División B players
Tercera División players
CD Numancia B players
CD Numancia players
CD Tudelano footballers
Barakaldo CF footballers
Burgos CF footballers
CD Badajoz players
CF Rayo Majadahonda players
FC Andorra players
Algeciras CF footballers